The arrondissement of Sarcelles is an arrondissement of France in the Val-d'Oise department in the Île-de-France region. It has 62 communes.

Composition

The communes of the arrondissement of Sarcelles, and their INSEE codes, are:

 Andilly (95014)
 Arnouville (95019)
 Asnières-sur-Oise (95026)
 Attainville (95028)
 Baillet-en-France (95042)
 Bellefontaine (95055)
 Belloy-en-France (95056)
 Bonneuil-en-France (95088)
 Bouffémont (95091)
 Bouqueval (95094)
 Châtenay-en-France (95144)
 Chaumontel (95149)
 Chennevières-lès-Louvres (95154)
 Deuil-la-Barre (95197)
 Domont (95199)
 Écouen (95205)
 Enghien-les-Bains (95210)
 Épiais-lès-Louvres (95212)
 Épinay-Champlâtreux (95214)
 Ézanville (95229)
 Fontenay-en-Parisis (95241)
 Fosses (95250)
 Garges-lès-Gonesse (95268)
 Gonesse (95277)
 Goussainville (95280)
 Groslay (95288)
 Jagny-sous-Bois (95316)
 Lassy (95331)
 Le Mesnil-Aubry (95395)
 Le Plessis-Gassot (95492)
 Le Plessis-Luzarches (95493)
 Le Thillay (95612)
 Louvres (95351)
 Luzarches (95352)
 Maffliers (95353)
 Mareil-en-France (95365)
 Margency (95369)
 Marly-la-Ville (95371)
 Moisselles (95409)
 Montlignon (95426)
 Montmagny (95427)
 Montmorency (95428)
 Montsoult (95430)
 Piscop (95489)
 Puiseux-en-France (95509)
 Roissy-en-France (95527)
 Saint-Brice-sous-Forêt (95539)
 Saint-Gratien (95555)
 Saint-Martin-du-Tertre (95566)
 Saint-Prix (95574)
 Saint-Witz (95580)
 Sarcelles (95585)
 Seugy (95594)
 Soisy-sous-Montmorency (95598)
 Survilliers (95604)
 Vaudherland (95633)
 Vémars (95641)
 Viarmes (95652)
 Villaines-sous-Bois (95660)
 Villeron (95675)
 Villiers-le-Bel (95680)
 Villiers-le-Sec (95682)

History

The arrondissement of Montmorency was created in 1962 as part of the department Seine-et-Oise. In 1968 it became part of the new department Val-d'Oise. In March 2000 Sarcelles replaced Montmorency as subprefecture. At the January 2017 reorganisation of the arrondissements of Val-d'Oise, it received two communes from the arrondissement of Pontoise, and it lost one commune to the arrondissement of Pontoise.

As a result of the reorganisation of the cantons of France which came into effect in 2015, the borders of the cantons are no longer related to the borders of the arrondissements. The cantons of the arrondissement of Sarcelles were, as of January 2015:

 Domont
 Écouen
 Enghien-les-Bains
 Garges-lès-Gonesse-Est
 Garges-lès-Gonesse-Ouest
 Gonesse
 Goussainville
 Luzarches
 Montmorency
 Saint-Gratien
 Sarcelles-Nord-Est
 Sarcelles-Sud-Ouest
 Soisy-sous-Montmorency
 Viarmes
 Villiers-le-Bel

References

Sarcelles